Dipka is a census town in Korba District in the state of Chhattisgarh, India. It is known for its Gevra and Dipka Open cast coal mines.

History
Dipka (earlier known as Junnadih) was a Gram Panchayat with very few population mostly part was covered by forest. With the expansion of Gevra Coal mine, South Eastern Coalfields Limited built residential colonies for their employees in the region which lead to conversion of village into a town and Gram Panchayat to Municipal Council.

Municipal Council, Dipka
Municipal Council, Dipka came into existence in 2004 with 21 wards.

Location
Dipka lies approximately 20 kilometres west of Korba City. It is surrounded by Pali and Katghora (both lies in NH-130) and other rural areas of Hardi Bazar, Ratija and has connectivity to Janjgir-Champa district towards south direction.

Demographics
 India census, Dipka had a population of 20,182. Males constitute 53% of the population and females 47%. Dipka has an average literacy rate of 73%, higher than the national average of 59.5%: male literacy is 79% and, female literacy is 67%. In Dipka, 17% of the population is under 6 years of age.

Education
There are various educational institutions in Dipka such as:

Schools
 DAV Public School, Gevra, Urja Nagar, Dipka
 Beacon English School, Shakti Nagar, Dipka
 Indus Public School, Batari, Dipka
 St. Thomas Public School, Pragati Nagar, Dipka
 Saraswati Shishu Mandir, Gevra Project, Dipka
 East point English medium high school, Santi Nagar, Dipka

College
 Government College, Dipka
 Param Mitra Industrial Training Institute, Dipka

Industries
Dipka houses Gevra and Dipka open cast coal mines which is part of Korba Coalfield of South Eastern Coalfields Limited. There is also various other industries such as Power generation companies owned by ACB (India) Group and other coal beneficiaries.

References

Cities and towns in Korba district